François Stroobant (14 June 1819 Brussels – 1 June 1916 Elsene) was a Belgian painter and lithographer, and brother of the lithographer Louis-Constantin Stroobant (1814–1872) noted for his part in Flore des Serres et des Jardins de l'Europe.

He attended the Brussels Académie des Beaux-Arts between 1832 and 1847, studying under François-Joseph Navez, Paul Lauters and François-Antoine Bossuet (1798–1889). In 1835 he worked in the studio of the lithographer Antoine Dewasme-Plétinckx (1797-1851) in Brussels.

Stroobant's subjects were mainly landscapes and architecture. He travelled extensively through the Netherlands, France, Germany, Switzerland, Italy, Spain and Hungary, exhibiting in the galleries of the Belgian towns Ghent, Antwerp and Brussels. His romantic painting style stayed constant throughout his career. He was founder and first director in 1865 of the Académie des Beaux-Arts at Sint-Jans-Molenbeek in Brussels.

In 1878 he was made an Officer in the Order of Leopold.

Selected paintings

References

1819 births
1916 deaths
Belgian lithographers
19th-century Belgian painters
19th-century Belgian male artists
20th-century Belgian painters
Artists from Brussels
20th-century Belgian male artists
20th-century lithographers